Gogonasus (meaning "snout from Gogo") was a lobe-finned fish known from three-dimensionally preserved 380-million-year-old fossils found from the Gogo Formation in Western Australia. It lived in the Late Devonian period, on what was once a 1,400-kilometre coral reef off the Kimberley coast surrounding the north-west of Australia. Gogonasus was a small fish reaching 30–40 cm (1 ft) in length.

Its skeleton shows several features that were like those of a four-legged land animal (tetrapod). They included the structure of its middle ear, and its fins show the precursors of the forearm bones, the radius and ulna. Researchers believe it used its forearm-like fins to dart out of the reef to catch prey.

Gogonasus was first described from a single snout (ethmosphenoid) by John A. Long (1985). On Long's 1967 expedition to Gogo the first relatively complete skull of Gogonasus was found by Chris Nelson and after being prepared by Sheila Mahala Andrews solved a scientific controversy by showing that the inner large fangs of the coronoid bones did not insert into the choana of the palate (Long 1988) as had been suggested by Rosen et al. (1981) for Eusthenopteron. In 1990 a combined expedition from the Western Australian Museum and the Australian National University yielded another almost complete skull of Gogonasus, this one found by Dr R. E. Barwick. The full description of its cranial anatomy appeared in Long, J. A., Barwick, R. E. & Campbell, K.S.W. (1997), although not all aspects of the skull were clear then even from the three specimens. In 2005 Long led another expedition back to Gogo and on July 11 one of the team members, Dr Tim Senden from the Australian National University, found a very well-preserved skeleton of Gogonasus, containing almost the complete fish down to the tip of the tail. It was Dr Senden's first field trip with the other researchers.

The specimen (NMV P221807) is now held at Museums Victoria, after nearly four months of acetic acid preparation by John Long. The new specimen showed some surprising new data not seen in any of the other specimens. Firstly, there were large spiracular openings on top of the skull, with a distinct down-folded cosmine-covered lamina of bone present on the tabular bone. This indicated its spiracles were almost as large as in the elpistostegalian fishes (like Tiktaalik) and early tetrapods (e.g. Acanthostega). Secondly, after preparation of its pectoral fins, the internal limb skeleton showed closer resemblances to that of the elpistostegalians than to other more generalised tetrapodomorph fishes like Eusthenopteron. For almost 100 years Eusthenopteron had been the well-used role model for demonstrating stages in the evolution of lobe-finned fishes to tetrapods. Gogonasus now replaces Eusthenopteron in being a better preserved representative without any ambiguity in interpreting its anatomy (as had been shown for example by Rosen et al. 1981 when erroneously reconstructing the fit of the lower jaws to the palate). Superficially, Gogonasus appears similar to the generalised tetrapodomorph fishes like Osteolepis from Scotland, but in its advanced features shows that even primitive-looking cosmine-covered forms evolved significant specializations towards becoming tetrapod-like.

Gogonasus is just one of the over 45 species of three-dimensionally preserved fishes from the Gogo Formation deposit. It is the only Devonian site in the world to yield whole complete fishes in perfect uncrushed preservation in some specimens.

See also

Other fish found in fossils from the Devonian period:
Mcnamaraspis kaprios, another fish from the Gogo Formation and Western Australia's fossil emblem
Tiktaalik
Eusthenopteron
Panderichthys
Actinistia
Materpiscis

References

External links
Ancient Gogonasus advances evolution, Museum Victoria.
Photographs and x-ray micro-tomography animation of Gogonasus from ANU
Gogonasus andrewsae by PZ Myers
Ancient Fish Fossil May Rewrite Story of Animal Evolution (National Geographic)
Livescience.com: "Discovery Points to Our Fishy Heritage." (Accessed 10/21/06)
Fox News: Primitive Fish Skeleton May Link Land, Sea
Interview with Dr John Long, curator at the Museum of Victoria

Late Devonian fish
Devonian bony fish
Megalichthyiforms
Prehistoric lobe-finned fish genera
Gogo fauna
Fossil taxa described in 1985